Vidius perigenes, known generally as the pale-rayed skipper or perigenes skipper, is a species of grass skipper in the butterfly family Hesperiidae. It is found in Central America, North America, and South America.

The MONA or Hodges number for Vidius perigenes is 3991.

References

Further reading

 

Hesperiinae
Articles created by Qbugbot